Greenup Lock and Dam is the 11th Lock and dam on the Ohio River, located 341 miles downstream of Pittsburgh.  There are 2 locks, one for commercial barge traffic that's 1,200 feet long by 110 feet wide, and the auxiliary lock is 600 feet long by 110 feet wide.

Gallery

See also
 List of locks and dams of the Ohio River
 List of locks and dams of the Upper Mississippi River
 Jesse Stuart Memorial Bridge, viaduct highway bridge that crosses over the Greenup Lock and Dam

References

External links
U.S. Army Corps of Engineers, Pittsburgh District
U.S. Army Corps of Engineers, Huntington District
U.S. Army Corps of Engineers, Louisville District

Dams on the Ohio River
Dams in Kentucky
Dams in Ohio
Dams completed in 1962
Locks of Kentucky
Locks of Ohio